Acromares is a genus from the subfamily Cosmetinae.

Taxonomy 
The genus Acromares has the following species

 Acromares banksi
 Acromares lateralis
 Acromares roeweri
 Acromares vittatum

References

Cosmetidae
Arachnid genera